Milan Uzelac (born 30 September 1978, in Rijeka) is a Croatian handballer, who plays as line player for RK Zamet.

Career
Mile started his career in RK Kvarner. At the age of 15 he played for the senior team of RK Kvarner and he played an important role in Kvarner getting promotion form 2. league to 1.B league. 

He spent a season in Zamet helping them win the league getting back in the Croatian First League and winning the Croatian U-19 Championship with players like Mirza Džomba and Renato Sulić. Next season he played for RK Pećine in the 1.B league. The following two years he played both for Zamet and Pećine due to them being in separate leagues. 

Mile has spent nearly 20 years in Zamet being with the club in hard and good times.  With Zamet he came to Croatian Cup finals three time losing twice to Zagreb and once to Metković Jambo.

He has played in European competitions EHF City Cup, EHF Cup Winners' Cup and EHF Cup throughout his career.

He was team captain of Zamet from 2003 to 2017 when he retired from handball alongside his long standing teammate Mateo Hrvatin. He is marked for being the longest serving player in Zamet's history playing 21 full years for the club.

Honours
RK Kvarner
2. HRL - West 
Winner (1): 1993-94

RK Zamet
Croatian First League 
Third (2): 1997-98, 1998-99
1.B HRL  
Winner (1): 1995-96
Croatian U-19 Championship 
Winner (1): 1996
Croatian Cup 
Finalist (3): 2000, 2001, 2012

References

External links
Eurohandball stats
Rukometstat stats
Rukometni Klub Zamet

1978 births
Living people
Croatian male handball players
Handball players from Rijeka
RK Kvarner players
RK Zamet players